Manoel Morais Amorim (born July 17, 1984 in Maceió) is a former Brazilian footballer.

Career

Club
On 6 June 2016, Morais signed for Indian Super League team NorthEast United, but was released by NorthEast United on 30 August 2016 before playing a competitive match for the club.

He was called up for the Brazil national team by coach Dunga in August 2006 for a away friendly against Norway (1-1 scoreline), but did not enter the match. In 2007 he was placed in the preliminary squad for the year's Copa América, hosted by Venezuela, but in the end was left out of the final list for the competition due to an injury.

Honours
Vasco da Gama
Rio de Janeiro State League: 2003

Atlético Paranaense
Paraná State League: 2005

Corinthians
Brazilian Championship Serie B: 2008
São Paulo State League: 2009
Brazilian Cup: 2009

Bahia
Campeonato Baiano: 2012

Atlético Mineiro
Campeonato Mineiro: 2013

References

External links
 zerozero.pt

1984 births
Living people
Brazilian footballers
Clube de Regatas Brasil players
CR Vasco da Gama players
Club Athletico Paranaense players
Sport Club Corinthians Paulista players
Esporte Clube Bahia players
Clube Atlético Mineiro players
Criciúma Esporte Clube players
América Futebol Clube (RN) players
Campeonato Brasileiro Série A players
Campeonato Brasileiro Série B players
Association football midfielders
People from Maceió
Sportspeople from Alagoas